Andrei Anatolyevich Silyutin (born 1 October 1976) is a former Russian professional footballer.

Club career
He made his Russian Football National League debut for FC Tom Tomsk on 9 April 2000 in a game against FC Nosta Novotroitsk. He played 7 seasons in the FNL for Tom, FC Anzhi Makhachkala and FC Volga Nizhny Novgorod.

Honours
 Kazakhstan Premier League champion: 2005.

External links
 

1976 births
Living people
Sportspeople from Barnaul
Russian footballers
Russian expatriate footballers
Expatriate footballers in Kazakhstan
FC Dynamo Barnaul players
FC Tom Tomsk players
FC Aktobe players
FC Anzhi Makhachkala players
Russian expatriate sportspeople in Kazakhstan
FC Volga Nizhny Novgorod players
FC Zvezda Irkutsk players
Kazakhstan Premier League players
Association football midfielders